Warchoł is a Polish surname originated from the nickname with the literal meaning of a troublemaker. Variations of the surname include: Varchol, Varhol, Warchol, Warhol, Warchał, Warhola, Warchoła, Warchała, etc. Notable people with the surname include:

 Andy Warhol (1928-1987),  American artist, film director, and producer
 Bartosz Warchoł (born 1992), Polish cyclist
 Damian Warchoł (born 1995), Polish footballer
 Michael Varhol, American screenwriter
Bohdan Warchal (1930-2000), Slovak violinist

See also

References

Polish-language surnames